The Masked Singer is a Belgian reality singing competition television series based on the Masked Singer franchise which originated from the South Korean version of the show King of Mask Singer. It premiered on VTM on 18 September 2020, and is hosted by Niels Destadsbader. The winner of the first series was Sandra Kim. The winner of the second series was Camille Dhont.

The second series premiered 14 January 2022 and ended on 18 March 2022. The third season started 3 January 2023. A live concert was announced.

Format
The Belgian series followed the format of the South Korean version it was based on.

The series was a singing competition. Contestants had to sing and perform songs, and compete in duels against each other. The studio audience could vote for the best performance, giving this singer a pass for the next round. Singers who lost the duels had to face the jury and the studio audience again, until one singer remained. That singer had to leave the competition.

The singers were masked. The singers didn't wear masks only but specially made costumes that hide their faces and bodies completely. The real identity of the singer was masked and the singer received a new identity of the costume he was wearing. The singers looked like the character, behaved like the character and were named as the character. The voice of the singer was changed into the characters voice by using a voice changer. Only during the singing performance, the true voice of the singer could be heard.

The series was a guessing game. The judges and the home audience had to guess the true identity of the masked singers. Throughout the series, they got clues of the identity by the hints the singer gave during the pretaped mini-movies or after his performance. Sometimes there were clues hidden in the costumes.

Production

Recording
In January 2020, VTM announced that they would be producing a local series of the franchise. Normally, the series would have been recorded in March 2020, but recording was delayed by the COVID-19 pandemic. Recording started in June but with a limited audience. The judges were in the same group they could meet during the social restrictions because of COVID-19. After the final of the first season at 6 November 2020, VTM confirmed a second season. This season was recorded during the summer of 2022.

Design
Lightning expert Michiel Milbou, executive producer Olivier Deprez, director Maryse Van den Wyngaert and set designer Koen Verbrugghe designed the set. The only certainty were two giant masks, left and right, as entrances to the stage.  The production was commended by The Economic Times for the set design and the clever use of lighting to give the impression there was a bigger audience. It was named one of the best and most beautiful productions of the international The Masked Singer editions. There was meant to be an audience of 300 people but because of COVID-19 measures, there was only an audience of 80 people possible. It took 1 hour to get the audience according to the measures and social restrictions safely into the studio. A home audience of 100 families was added.

Selection
Potential contestants for the first season were invited for a meeting. The format was explained and videos shown of international editions. Non-professional singers had to sing for 10 minutes for the singing coach of the series. Some contestants weren't withhold because of the limited capacity of their voice. After being selected the contestants received singing and dancing training.

Costumes
After seeing the South-Korean format, the production knew that the costumes had to be high level to make the concept work in Flanders. Emmy Award-winning costume designer Marina Toybina created the costumes for the first three seasons. The process of creating a costume took three months. It started with the Belgian production pitching what characters they want. Toybina made concepts based on those wishes. The concepts were then used by the Belgian team to design the costume. The costumes are made in Germany and the masks in Austria. At that time it is known who will wear the costumes, so the costumes can be fitted to the height and seize of the contestant.

Every candidate needed half or a full hour to get into the costume. Bathroom breaks were carefully planned. After only 10 minutes it became 35 degrees behind the masks. The costume of Queen was the heaviest with 12 kg. The costume of Dragonfly was the widest with 2,5 meters. The costumes of Diver and Monkey were modified during the season according to the songs they performed. The costume of Wolf had to be adjusted because the candidate got backproblems due to the weight of the tail. The helmet of Diver had so much condensation after three minutes, the contestant had to sing and perform blinded. Contestant Kathleen Aerts had to be overcome her claustrophobia to be able to wear the mask. During season two the temperature of the costume of Cyclops was measured 56 degrees. To remove the smell from the costumes, the dressmakers used vodka.

Contestants of the second season were again subjected to extreme conditions. The temperature inside the costume of Cyclops was measured 56 degrees Celsius one time and the head only of Red Deer weighed 10 kg. Contestants had a special designed armor to divide the heaviness of their costumes. The costume of Radish was made to have two arms outside but because of a weak shoulder of the contestant, the character had only one moving arm.

Security

The series had a codename during the production of the first season, "Meloenenjacht". The series is prerecorded so there are fewer people aware that the series beind recorded. The first two series were recorded during summer, at a time where the contestants had more free time at their schedules and it wouldn't be obvious to their relatives they would be away during the recording days.

The series had a codename during the production of the first season, "Meloenenjacht". Only 8 people knew the identity of the participants in advance: the executives of VTM, the singing and dancing coaches and directors of the series. The contestants also knew the identity of the other contestants. No other people were informed. Contestants had to get permission of the production team if they needed to inform their partner, family or children. VTM also asked the press not to leak any information about the identity of the participants if something was discovered.

During their arrival and exit at the recording studios the singers wear concealing black clothes, including the hoodie with the message "Don't talk to me" and masks. The contestants were brought with anonymous cars to the recording studios and had to put their personal belongings in a black bag. During rehearsals contestants had to use sign language or a chalk board to communicate with the crew because it was forbidden to use their real talking voice. For the second season the departure of the singers was strictly organised since people already knew the show and were more attentive.

Even the live studio audience didn't know the identity of the participants because the unmasking was taped after they had left the studio. The audience of the second season was selected by their participation of the first season, believing people who were curious for the first season would understand the importance of not telling others about the characters and costumes they witnessed. The cameras of the smartphones were also taped and checked when leaving the studios.

Everybody, the contestants, the crew, the judging panel and the audience, had to sign a non-disclosure agreement. There were 200.000 euros fine.

Cast

Panelists and host
Following the announcement of the series in January 2020, Niels Destadsbader was confirmed as the host of the series. Julie Van den Steen was also announced. It was later revealed she would be part of the judging panel. By the end of January 2020 Jens Dendoncker and Karen Damen were announced as members of the panel.

In the second season Andy Peelman, Kevin Janssens and Ruth Beeckmans, who participated at the first season as masked singers, joined the panel of the first season. Of this group of 6 judges, some of them would be selected for each episode.

In every episode during the first season, there was a guest judge. These guest judges were Sean Dhondt, Leen Dendievel, Guga Baúl, Ingeborg, Laura Tesoro, Vincent Banić, and Lize Feryn. In the second season Bart Kaëll was a guest judge.

In the third season Jens Dendoncker left the panel and became the new host. Julie Van den Steen, Kevin Janssens and Andy Peelman returned as judges. Participants of the second season, Tine Embrechts and Bart Cannaerts were added to the judge panel.

Series overview

Reception

Ratings
The series was very successful. The first episode was watched by more than one million viewers. The second episode got the highest rating for broadcaster VTM in five years. The 7th episode broke the record of highest rating for VTM since the rating started to be recorded in 1997. The episode had 1.7 million viewers. The final established a record with more than 2 million viewers, the highest rating for VTM in 20 years.

The first episode of the second season was watched by almost 1,4 million viewers. With delayed viewers, there were 1,8 million viewers. Channel manager Janssen and creative director Parmentier called it an unseen start.

The third season season started with almost 2 million viewers, making it the best rates for the show since its debut. So after three seasons, the formula still hadn't worked out.

Critical response
The series had very high ratings during the first season. Executive producers pointed three reasons for its popularity: it's one of the little programs that can be watched by the whole family together, the excitement and curiosity about who's behind the masks and the visual attractive show with eyecatching costumes, popular music and beautiful staging. The interaction with the social media improved the popularity. The first season was also broadcoasted at the time of a second lockdown during the COVID-19 pandemic in Belgium. Because of the lockdown many people were at home.

The second season in 2022 however confirmed the popularity of the program. Critics were sceptic about the program, saying the purpose of the show is unclear. They referred to the character Red Deer, one of the best singers, who was almost voted out during the first episode, saying this made clear it isn't a competition about being the best singer. On the other hand, if the purpose would be who's the best in keeping his true identity secret, top tennis player Yanina Wickmayer shouldn't had to unmask herself during the first episode because neither the panel neither the audience guessed her identity. Other critics believed the show is simple but very clever entertainment. There are no limits about the guesses which makes everyone guessing, and returning to see if the guesses are correct.

Some critics commented about the call of panel member Julie Van den Steen during the second season to like a photo of unmasked participants Robots, saying if they'd get 50.000 likes they would return for the final. Commenters pointed out their return was fixed and the voting was pointless, since the season was recorded months before the broadcast. The unmasking of party chairman Conner Rousseau also sparked the question if an important politician should participate at an entertainment show.

Awards and nominations

Specials
During the final week of the first season, two specials aired. On 4 November De Geheimen achter The Masked Singer aired on VTM. It was a compilation of the stories of the unmasked celebrities from the spin-off The Masked Singer: Behind the Mask. It had 616.168‏ viewers. On 7 November the special The Masked Singer: The Day After aired. This was a special about the finalists and winner. This special had 919.230‏‏ viewers.

Spin-off
In the online spin-off The Masked Singer: Behind the Mask, the unmasked celebrities shared their story. Each episode included some behind the scenes footage on how they prepared for their live performances. They all agreed on one thing: it was extremely difficult to perform as a masked singer because it was very hot inside the mask, visibility was limited, and they had difficulty breathing. The episodes were available exclusively on VTM's video streaming platform VTM GO.

Since the second season The Masked Singer: Behind the Mask was also broadcast by VTM. The first episode had 439.644‏ viewers.

The Masked Singer in Concert
Following the succes of the first two seasons and the launch of the third season, a live concert in Sportpaleis in Antwerp with participants of all three seasons was announced.  The winners of the first two seasons joined the line-up.

Other media
Hoodies using the show's branding were purchasable on the aligned newspaper online store since the first season. Four costumes of the second season were available as onesies for children during the second season. Following the third season, a capsule collection was available.

The winner of the first season, Sandra Kim, immediately released a single after her victory. It was a cover version of the show's theme song Who Are You, produced by Regi.

There was a special event for the second season final. In Kinepolis Antwerpen the final was shown in one of the theatres. The public could meet the contestants and see en be photographed with the costumes of that season.

For the third season collector cards were made.

See also

The Masked Singer franchise

Notes

References

External links
 

2020 Belgian television series debuts
2020s music television series
Belgian television series based on South Korean television series
Masked Singer
VTM (TV channel) original programming